Macromolecular Bioscience is a monthly peer-reviewed scientific journal covering polymer science. It publishes Reviews, Feature Articles, Communications, and Full Papers at the intersection of polymer and materials sciences with life science and medicine. The editorial office is in Weinheim, Germany. The editor-in-chief is Anne Pfisterer. According to the Journal Citation Reports, the journal has a 2020 impact factor of 4.979.

Abstracting and indexing
 BIOSIS Previews
 Biochemistry & Biophysics Citation Index
 Science Citation Index 
 Current Contents/Physical, Chemical & Earth Sciences
 Chemical Abstracts Service 
 Advanced Polymers Abstracts  
 BIOBASE
 Biotechnology & Bioengineering Abstracts 
 Compendex
 Embase 
 Scopus
 Ceramic Abstracts
 Civil Engineering Abstracts 
 Earthquake Engineering Abstracts 
 Engineered Materials Abstracts 
 International Aerospace Abstracts & Database 
 MEDLINE/PubMed 
 Polymer Library

References

External links

Materials science journals
Publications established in 2001
Biochemistry journals
Wiley (publisher) academic journals
English-language journals